Leo–Chlorodont was an Italian professional cycling team that existed from 1955 to 1958. Its sponsors were Italian hand cream Leo and German toothpaste Chlorodont. Gastone Nencini won the general classification of the 1957 Giro d'Italia with the team.

References

External links
 

Cycling teams based in Italy
Defunct cycling teams based in Italy
1955 establishments in Italy
1958 disestablishments in Italy
Cycling teams established in 1955
Cycling teams disestablished in 1958